This is a list of notable Rusyn Americans.

To be included in this list, the person must have a Wikipedia article showing they are Rusyn American or must have references showing they are Rusyn American and are notable.

List

 Sandra Dee, actress (Rusyn mother)
 Steve Ditko, comic book illustrator and co-creator of Spider-Man (Rusyn father)
 Harry Dorish, professional baseball player, St. Louis Browns (Rusyn father, "Slovakian" mother)
 Bill Evans, jazz musician (Rusyn mother)
 Nick Holonyak, electrical engineer (both parents Rusyn)
 Thomas Hopko, Orthodox Christian theologian
 John Kanzius, inventor, (Rusyn American – mother)
 Paul Robert Magocsi
 Bret Michaels, singer-songwriter and musician (Rusyn paternal grandfather)
 Wentworth Miller, actor (mother's ancestry includes Rusyn ancestors)
 Stan Musial, professional baseball player, St. Louis Cardinals (Rusyn mother, Polish father)
 Tom Ridge, politician (Rusyn mother)
 Lizabeth Scott, actress (both parents Rusyn)
 Mark Singel, politician (Rusyn father)
 Laurus Škurla, First Hierarch of the Russian Orthodox Church Outside Russia, metropolitan of Eastern America and New York
 John Spencer, actor (Rusyn mother)
 Robert Urich, actor (Rusyn father)
 Andy Warhol, artist (both parents Rusyn)
 James Warhola, illustrator
 Peter Wilhousky, composer (both parents Rusyn)
 Craig Wycinsky, professional football player for Cleveland Browns
 Gregory Zatkovich, lawyer and political activist (Rusyn immigrant)
 Paul Zatkovich, newspaper editor and cultural activist (Rusyn immigrant)
 Chris Zylka, actor, director, producer and model. (Maternal Grandmother, Patricia Rosko, born into a family of Ruthenian/Rusyn/Slovakian heritage.)

References

Further reading
 

Rusyn
Rusyn